Events in the year 1866 in Paraguay.

Incumbents
President: Francisco Solano López
Vice President: Domingo Francisco Sánchez

Events
January 31 - Battle of Pehuajó
May 2 - Paraguayan War: Battle of Estero Bellaco
May 24 - Battle of Tuyutí
July 18 - Battle of Boquerón (1866)
September 1–3 - Battle of Curuzú
September 22 - Battle of Curupayty

Births

Deaths
July 18 - Elizardo Aquino, general, killed in action